Christiane Vienne (born 1951) is a Belgian politician and a member of the Parti Socialiste. She was elected as a member of the Belgian Senate in 2007.

Notes

Living people
Government ministers of Wallonia
Socialist Party (Belgium) politicians
Members of the Belgian Federal Parliament
1951 births
21st-century Belgian politicians
21st-century Belgian women politicians